Daniël Rudolf van Vuuren (born 31 May 1991) is a Namibian rugby union player for the  in the Currie Cup and the Rugby Challenge. His regular position is hooker.

Rugby career

Van Vuuren was born in Windhoek.

References

External links
 

1991 births
Living people
Namibia international rugby union players
Namibian rugby union players
North-West University alumni
People educated at Windhoek High School
Rugby union hookers
Rugby union players from Windhoek
Welwitschias players